Novonikolayevka is a rural locality (a selo) and the administrative center of Novonikolayevsky Selsoviet, Rubtsovsky District, Altai Krai, Russia. The population was 887 as of 2013. There are 13 streets.

Geography 
Novonikolayevka is located 34 km southeast of Rubtsovsk (the district's administrative centre) by road. Romanovka is the nearest rural locality.

References 

Rural localities in Rubtsovsky District